World Without Stars is also the title of a 1966 science fiction novel by Poul Anderson

World Without Stars is volume three in the French graphic novel (bande dessinée) science fiction series Valérian and Laureline created by writer Pierre Christin and artist Jean-Claude Mézières.

Synopsis

Valérian and Laureline are in the Ukbar system assisting human colonists who have settled on its four planets. Their job almost complete, they are now on a farewell tour of inspection. Arriving at Ukbar I, Valérian delivers his farewell speech at a reception in honour of the two agents from Galaxity. Later, one of the colonists invites Valérian to sample one of the first products of their new world – an alcoholic beverage distilled from algae. Proceeding to Ukbar II, Valérian delivers the same speech and again is invited to sample some of the locals' homemade booze. Laureline is alarmed when a somewhat intoxicated Valérian takes the astroship wildly off course on the way to Ukbar III. On Ukbar III, Valérian stumbles through the speech before being offered to try out the alcohol made on this planet. Returning to the astroship, Valérian falls over and Laureline at last realises he is drunk. Refusing to allow Laureline to pilot the ship, he makes a mess of the landing on Ukbar IV. Emerging from the ship, Valérian and Laureline discover the colony is deserted. Everyone is gathered in the observatory – a rogue planet has been spotted and it's on a collision course with the Ukbar system. With the cargo ships dismantled, there is no way to evacuate the colonists. Valérian makes another speech, promising to deal with the situation and then takes off with Laureline for the planet.

While Valérian sleeps off the drink, Laureline makes the space-time jump to the planet. Exploring the surface they find it to be a lifeless, airless, barren rock but their curiosity is piqued by some phosphorescent lakes. Taking a launch from the astroship, they dive into one of the lakes and are astonished when they emerge on the other side – it is a hollow planet! Light is provided by the planet's nucleus and there is a small rocky moon in orbit.

Searching for a place to land they see a strange sight – houses pulled by animals. Suddenly a section of the ridge one of the houses is travelling along gives way. Valérian swoops in with the launch and saves the house and its inhabitants from falling. Landing, a man introduces himself as Mutahar of the Lemm people of the planet Zahir. They are nomads who travel in the shadow of the moon collecting explosive flogums which they sell to the cities Malka and Valsennar. Suddenly a great wind rips through the camp. Mutahar explains that this is caused by the war between Malka and Valsennar – they use the flogums as weapons in the fight. Laureline checks the measuring devices in the launch – the detonation of the flogums during the battles is what is causing Zahir to tumble through space. The pair realise there is only once course of action open to them – stop the war.

The pair split up – Valérian travels with the Lemm men to Malka, since women are forbidden from entering the city while Laureline travels with the Lemm women to Valsennar since men are forbidden from entering that city. Reaching Malka, Valérian parts company with the Lemm and gains entry through the city's considerable fortifications via the sewer system. Exploring the back streets, Valérian is surprised to see only men – cooking, cleaning, looking after the children. Soon he finds out where the women are when a formidable group of riders, all female, round up a group of the men. They are to be conscripts in the war with Valsennar – Valérian and the rest of the men are put through intensive military training. Later, resting in the barracks, the other men tell Valérian that they are at war with Valsennar because that city is ruled by men – a perversion of the natural order: men are inferior. Few men survive the battles and those that do are sent to the Palace of Supreme Femininity for reproductive duties.

Elsewhere, Laureline reaches Valsennar and, like Valérian, parts company with the Lemm. Unlike Malka, Valsennar is a beautiful city with canals, gardens and sumptuous palaces. Wandering the back streets, Laureline meets an old lady, Nadjika, who persuades her to enter the emperor's beauty contest. Despite making a mess of the cooking, weaving and singing elements of the competition, the emperor, Alzafar, takes a shine to her and declares her the winner. She is brought back to the Palace of Resplendent Virility to join his harem. On the way they pass the emperor's war fleet. Laureline notices that all the soldiers are women – the emperor explains that women do all the work in Valsennar including fighting.

The day of the battle comes and the war fleet of airships and flying elytrons (insects) takes off from Malka led by Queen Klopka the Ravishing. At the same time the war fleet of Valsennar takes off with the flagship of Emperor Alzafar and his court bring up the rear where they can enjoy the spectacle of the fight. The battle is engaged near the sun and Valérian is soon caught up in the bloody combat. In an attempt to impress the queen, taking an elytron flogum carrier he destroys several of Valsennar's ships and makes a successful bombing run on the Palace of Resplendent Virility before making to attack the emperor's flagship. This throws everyone on board into a panic – no one has ever attacked the emperor's ship before – except Laureline who grabs a crossbow and shoots the attacker down. Seconds later, she is horrified to see that it's Valérian. Valérian manages to save himself by jumping onto a drifting ship.

Returning to Malka, Valérian is given his own apartments in the Palace of Supreme Femininity while Laureline is now the emperor's favorite in the surviving wing of the Palace of Resplendent Virility. Calling Valérian on her radio, Laureline is delighted to find Valérian is unharmed. They decide that they must kidnap the two monarchs and bring them together to find a way to end the conflict. Valérian knocks out Queen Klopka with a stunner and Laureline drugs Emperor Alzafar's drink.

Meeting at the launch, they decide the best thing to do is to show the queen and the emperor the universe outside Zahir in the hope that they will then understand the peril they are in. They are disturbed when Klopka and Alzafar come round and begin fighting with each other. Pulling them apart, Valérian and Laureline calm them down and put them both in the launch. When they pass through into the outside of Zahir, Klopka and Alzafar see the stars for the first time. They are so shocked they go into a dead faint straight away. Bringing them to the astroship Valérian uses the hypnotic instruction machinery there to describe the universe to Klopka and Alzafar. Now aware of the danger they are in, they agree to put their differences aside and work to save Zahir and Ukbar.

Valérian hatches a plan. The Malka, the Valsennar and the Lemm people all work together to gather as many flogums as possible and place them around the planet according to Valérian's instructions. At the right time, Valérian executes a series of spatio-temporal jumps detonating the flogums at the right time such that Zahir enters a safe orbit and becomes the fifth planet of Ukbar. The settlers of Ukbar and the Zahirians open up contact with a view to trade. On Zahir, society is rocked to discover that Klopka has married Alzafar and other marriages follow, leading to the collapse of the chauvinistic divisions between the two sides.

Their mission completed, Valérian claims that he is not against the matriarchy system and to prove it he tells Laureline to get on with taking them back to Galaxity while he gets drunk on Zahirian alcohol.

Main characters
 Valérian, a spatio-temporal agent from Galaxity, future capital of Earth, in the 28th century
 Laureline, originally from France in the 11th century, now a spatio-temporal agent of Galaxity in the 28th century
 Klopka The Ravishing, queen of Malka
 Alzafar, emperor of Valsennar
 Muatahar, of the Lemm people, a prospector and trader in flogums
 Nadjika, an old peasant from the back streets of Valsennar

Settings
 The Ukbar system, 28th century, the outer regions of the galaxy. Galaxity has colonised four planets in the system – Ukbar I is a waterworld where the settlers have built floating platforms like oil rigs, Ukbar II is a  pastoral world, Ukbar III is industrial while Ukbar IV appears more barren.
 The planet Zahir, on a collision course with Ukbar. The surface is barren and airless with phosphorescent lakes that lead into the hollow centre of the planet which is habitable. The core of the planet acts as a sun and it has a small moon in orbit around it. The explosive flogums grow in the shadow of the moon thanks to a property of its rays. The nomadic Lemm people follow the path of the moon and harvest the flogums for sale. There are two major cities on Zahir – Malka and Valsennar. The fortress-like Malka is ruled by women whereas Valsennar, with its delicate palaces and gardens is ruled by men. The regular explosions caused as result of the war between Malka and Valsennar have caused that planet to break free of the orbit around its sun and now it wanders through space, its inhabitants oblivious to the hazard it poses to other planets.

Notes
 In this album the two characters are separated for most of the adventure, allowing Laureline to come out from under Valérian's shadow for the first time. Second, while in the previous stories the two heroes encountered and fought obvious villains or evil geniuses, here the two races of Zahir are separated by ideology. The key plot point, that Valérian and Laureline must try to find some means of reconciliation between two opposing sides, will be repeated in many of the subsequent adventures.
 The central concepts of this album use a number of well known science fiction clichés — a hollow planet has been explored most notably by Jules Verne and Edgar Rice Burroughs, the notion of a catastrophe caused by a planetary collision has been seen in the film When Worlds Collide while the war-of-the-sexes concept crops up in Star Trek, Buck Rogers, Lost In Space and the like.
 This album include visual and conceptual elements inspired by Frank Herbert's Dune, the French editions of which were published in 1970 and 1972, in the same period as this comic book. The Lemm people have "blue-in-blue" eyes like Dune's Fremen, their environment looks like planet Arrakis and they mine an explosive substance called 'flogum' (reminiscent of Dune's spice melange) which they sell to feuding houses reminiscent of Houses Atreides and Harkonnen.
 This album was translated into English by L. Mitchell and published in 1984 by Dargaud USA in the United States of America and in 1985 by Hodder Dargaud Ltd in the United Kingdom.

1972 graphic novels
Valérian and Laureline
Rogue planets in fiction
1970 in comics
1971 in comics